Pervomaysky is a rural locality (a settlement) and the administrative center of Pervomaysky District, Orenburg Oblast, Russia. Population:

References

Notes

Sources

Rural localities in Orenburg Oblast